Josiah Willis Crosby (1818-1904) was an American lawyer and politician from Maine. As a Republican, he served in the Maine Senate during 1867 and 1868. In 1868, he served as Senate President.

Crosby was born in Dover, New Hampshire in 1818. He studied at Foxcroft Academy in Foxcroft, Maine. Despite illness, he studied law and was admitted to the Piscataquis County, Maine bar in 1838. In 1845, he moved to Dexter, Maine, where he resided for the remainder of his life. Politically, Crosby was first a Whig, then Republican, and finally a Democrat. 

He represented Dexter and Corinna in the Maine House of Representatives during the 1857, 1863, and 1865 terms and Penobscot County as a whole in 1867 and 1868. A graduate of Bowdoin College, he was actively involved in his alma mater's alumni association. In 1863, he was elected a member of the Maine Historical Society. He was integral to the building of the Dexter and Newport Railroad, which was completed in 1868.

He married twice. He married Henrietta Hill in 1844. The couple had two children, both of whom died in infancy and she died in 1846. In 1849, he married Mary Bradbury Foss, the daughter of prominent attorney Simeon Foss of Dexter. The pair had nine children, seven of whom were still alive at the time of his death in 1904. One of his children, Harold J. Crosby, became a well-known composer.

References

1818 births
1904 deaths
People from Dover, New Hampshire
Foxcroft Academy alumni
Maine lawyers
Bowdoin College alumni
Maine Republicans
Maine Whigs
Maine Democrats
People from Dexter, Maine
Members of the Maine House of Representatives
Presidents of the Maine Senate